Pure Imagination is a 1998 album by jazz pianist Eric Reed released through Impulse! Records. This album contains reinterpretations (remakes) of traditional pop songs from classic Broadway and Hollywood productions such as Willy Wonka & the Chocolate Factory, Porgy and Bess, A Little Night Music among others. Pure Imagination has peaked at #8 on Billboard's Top Jazz Album charts. All songs are written by famous songwriters of said productions except for the opening and closing tracks composed by Reed himself.

Track listing
 "Overture"
 "Maria" (Leonard Bernstein, Richard Rodgers, & Stephen Sondheim)
 "Hello, Young Lovers" (Rodgers and Hammerstein)
 "Pure Imagination" (Leslie Bricusse, & Anthony Newley)
 "42nd Street" (Harry Warren & Al Dubin)
 "Send in the Clowns" (Stephen Sondheim)
 "My Man's Gone Now/Gone, Gone, Gone" (DuBose Heyward, George, & Ira Gershwin)
 "Nice Work If You Can Get It" (George & Ira Gershwin)
 "You'll Never Walk Alone" (Rodgers and Hammerstein)
 "I Got Rhythm" (George & Ira Gershwin)
 "Finale (Last Trip)"

Although lyrics were written for the songs from tracks 2 to 10, these are instrumental recordings.

Personnel
 Eric Reed – Piano
 Brian Bromberg – Bass
 Reginald Veal - Bass
 Gregory Hutchinson - Drums
 Tommy LiPuma – Producer

References

External Links and Sources
Eric Reed Discography

1998 albums
Jazz albums by American artists
Albums produced by Tommy LiPuma
Impulse! Records albums